Paulus Iiyambo (born 18 March 1982) is a Namibian long distance runner. He competed in the men's marathon at the 2017 World Championships in Athletics, placing 37th in a time of 2:19:45.

References

External links

1982 births
Living people
Namibian male long-distance runners
Namibian male marathon runners
World Athletics Championships athletes for Namibia
Place of birth missing (living people)